Kushk-e Nar Rural District is a rural district (dehestan) in the Kushk-e Nar District of Parsian County, Hormozgan Province, Iran. At the 2006 census, its population was 7,771, in 1,462 families.  The rural district has 12 villages.

References 

 http://khabarfarsi.com/n/6838025

Rural Districts of Hormozgan Province